Dong Dong (born April 13, 1989 in Zhengzhou, Henan) is a Chinese trampoline gymnast. He is an Olympic champion and four-time medalist, winning gold at London 2012, silver at Rio 2016 and Tokyo 2020, and bronze at Beijing 2008. Between 2007 and 2014, he made the podium at every World Championships and Olympics.

Career

2005–2008 
Dong joined the Chinese national team in 2005, and made his international debut in 2006.

At the 2007 World Championships in Quebec City, Dong came in second in the individual event and won gold in the team event. 

At the 2008 Summer Olympics, he won the bronze medal in the individual event, which is the only trampoline event at the Olympics. His final score was 40.600.

2009–2012 
He won the 2009 World Championships Individual Championship in St. Petersburg, Russia. He and his teammates also defended their team crown and won gold in the team event again. 

At the 2012 Summer Olympics, he won the gold medal with a score of 62.990.

2013–2016 
At the 2015 World Championships, he won his 10th career World Championship gold medal by winning the synchro event with Tu Xiao. 

At the 2016 Summer Olympics, he won the silver medal with a score of 60.535.

2017–present 
In 2017, he won a gold medal in men's synchro at The World Games 2017 in Wrocław, Poland.

In 2018, he was first individually and in synchro at the Brescia World Cup. At the Maebashi World Cup, he was first in synchro; at the Loule World Cup he was fourth individually and fifth in synchro. At the 2018 World Championships, he won individual silver with a score of 61.185. He ranked fifth in men's synchro and first in the team all-around.

At the 2019 Baku World Cup, Dong was second individually. At the World Championships he won individual bronze and team silver.

At the 2020 Baku World Cup, Dong won individual bronze.

In 2021, he won the silver medal in the men's trampoline event at the 2020 Summer Olympics in Tokyo, Japan.

References

External links 
 
 
 

1989 births
Living people
People from Zhengzhou
Gymnasts from Henan
Chinese male trampolinists
Olympic gymnasts of China
Olympic medalists in gymnastics
Olympic gold medalists for China
2016 Olympic silver medalists for China
Olympic bronze medalists for China
Medalists at the 2008 Summer Olympics
Medalists at the 2012 Summer Olympics
Medalists at the 2020 Summer Olympics
Gymnasts at the 2008 Summer Olympics
Gymnasts at the 2012 Summer Olympics
Gymnasts at the 2016 Summer Olympics
Gymnasts at the 2020 Summer Olympics
Asian Games medalists in gymnastics
Asian Games gold medalists for China
Medalists at the 2010 Asian Games
Medalists at the 2014 Asian Games
Medalists at the 2018 Asian Games
Gymnasts at the 2010 Asian Games
Gymnasts at the 2014 Asian Games
Gymnasts at the 2018 Asian Games
World Games gold medalists
Competitors at the 2013 World Games
Competitors at the 2017 World Games
Medalists at the Trampoline Gymnastics World Championships
20th-century Chinese people
21st-century Chinese people